The Legend of Zelda is a video game series created by Shigeru Miyamoto and Takashi Tezuka, and developed and published by Nintendo. The Legend of Zelda video games have been developed exclusively for Nintendo video game consoles and handhelds, dating from the Family Computer Disk System to the current generation of video game consoles. Spin-off titles, however, have been released on non-Nintendo systems. The franchise currently consists of 29 video games, including original titles, ports, remakes and collections. Over 52 million copies have been sold since the release of the first game. The franchise also includes an American cartoon adaptation, multiple comic book adaptations, as well as soundtracks.

Gameplay consists of a mixture of action, adventure, puzzle-solving, and role-playing video games. The series centers on Link, the main protagonist and player character. Link is often given the task of rescuing Princess Zelda and the most common setting of the series, Hyrule, from Ganon, the series' primary antagonist. Other minor settings and antagonists have appeared throughout the series; Vaati has become one of the series' recurring antagonists. Games in The Legend of Zelda series with two-dimensional (2D) graphics feature side-scrolling or overhead view gameplay, while games with three-dimensional (3D) graphics give the player a third-person perspective. The franchise holds several Guinness World Records, including the first game with a battery-powered save feature and the longest-running action-adventure series.

Video games

Main series

Remakes

Collections

Spin-offs

Other media

Soundtracks

Notes

References 

 
Legend of Zelda media
Legend of Zelda
Legend of Zelda, The